Phaeoscincus taomensis is a species of skink found in New Caledonia.

References

Phaeoscincus
Reptiles described in 2014
Skinks of New Caledonia
Endemic fauna of New Caledonia
Taxa named by Anthony Whitaker
Taxa named by Sarah A. Smith
Taxa named by Aaron M. Bauer